The Alton Military Prison was a prison located in Alton, Illinois, built in 1833 as the first state penitentiary in Illinois and closed in 1857. During the American Civil War, the prison was reopened in 1862 to accommodate the growing population of Confederate prisoners of war and ceased to be prison at the end of the war in 1865. The prison building was demolished not long after the Civil War. All that remains of the former prison site is a section of ruin wall that is maintained by the State of Illinois as an historic site. The prison site is included in the U.S. National Register of Historic Places.

History

Illinois State Penitentiary
In 1833, Illinois State Prison in Alton was built as the first state penitentiary in Illinois opening with twenty-four prison cells. In 1857, the prison was closed and replaced by a new state prison in Joliet. At the time of closure the Alton prison had a total of two-hundred-fifty-six cells.
Female prisoners were also incarcerated at Alton Penitentiary. From 1835 to 1858 sixty-five women and three thousand men were sentenced to Alton. Female prisoners endured the same degrading conditions as men while their gender exposed them to added indignities and abuses. In 1845 male inspectors claimed that, "One female prisoner is of more trouble than twenty males." Women served, on average, 0.9 years and 47% were pardoned by the governor.

American Civil War prison
In 1862, the U.S. government reopened the prison to house Confederate prisoners of war during the American Civil War. The prison housed over 11,000 prisoners during the war, including Confederate officer Ebenezer Magoffin. Deaths at the prison were more common than at other Union prisons, and prisoners faced harsh conditions and regular outbreaks of diseases such as smallpox and rubella. 1,534 Confederate soldiers and many Union soldiers and civilians are known to have died at the prison.

Historic site
The Alton prison closed again in 1865 and was later demolished; all that remains of the structure is a section of a wall. The prison site was added to the National Register of Historic Places on December 31, 1974. It is also part of the Christian Hill Historic District, which was listed on the National Register in 1978. The Alton prison site is maintained by the State of Illinois as a state historic site.

References

Allen, Lyman.  The Graybeards: The Letters of Major Lyman Allen, of the 37th Regiment Iowa Volunteer Infantry, the "Graybeards", Including the Diaries of Viola Baldwin His Step-daughter.  Iowa City, IA:  Press of the Camp Pope Bookshop, 1998. 
Banks, Cyndi.  Women in Prison:  A Reference Handbook.  Santa Barbara, CA:  ABC-CLIO, 2003.
Blanton, DeAnne and Lauren Cook Wike.  They Fought Like Demons: Women Soldiers in the American Civil War Conflicting Worlds: New Dimensions of the American Civil War Baton Rouge, LA:  Louisiana State University, 2002.
Casstevens, Frances Harding.  Out of the Mouth of Hell": Civil War Prisons and Escapes.   Jefferson, NC:  McFarland & Company, Incorporated, Publishers, 2005.    
Chaneles, Sol, Ed. Prisons and Prisoners: Historical Documents.  London, UK:  Psychology Press, 1985.
Dix, Dorothea Lynde.  Asylum, Prison, and Poorhouse: The Writings and Reform Work of Dorothea Dix in Illinois.  Carbondale, IL:  Southern Illinois University Press, 1999.  
Frost, Griffin.  Camp and Prison Journal.  Iowa City, IA:  Press of the Camp Pope Bookshop, 2000.
Gillispie, James M.  Andersonvilles of the North: The Myths and Realities of Northern Treatment of Civil War Confederate Prisoners.  Denton, TX:  University of North Texas Press, 2008.   
Gray, Francis Calley.  Prison Discipline in America, Volume 3 of With Prison Discipline Society.  Boston, MA:  J. Murray, 1848.
Illinois General Assembly. Reports Made to the General Assembly of Illinois, Volume 1. Springfield, IL:  Illinois General Assembly, 1859.         
McFarland, Joe.  "When Salt was Gold - Illinois DNR", Outdoor Illinois, October 2009. Springfield, IL:  Illinois Department of Natural Resources.
John, Paul.  John Gulley Genealogy: A Planter in Alabama and Arkansas and His Descendants : Also the Families of Bizzell, Godley, Ligon, Mendenhall, Purifoy, and Others of England and Colonial America.  P. John, 1991. 
Morn, Frank.  Forgotten Reformer: Robert McClaughry and Criminal Justice Reform in Nineteenth-century America.   Lanham, MD:  University Press of America, 2010.
Speer, Lonnie R. Portals to Hell: Military Prisons of the Civil War.  Lincoln, NE:  University of Nebraska Press, 2005.  
Stallings, James E.  Georgia's Confederate soldiers who died as prisoners of war 1861-1865.  J.E. Stallings, Sr., 2008.
Taylor, Troy.  Haunted Illinois: Ghosts and Strange Phenomena of the Prairie State.   Mechanicsburg, PA:  Stackpole Books, 2008.
United States Congress.  The Congressional Globe, Volume 66.  Washington DC:  Blair & Rives, 1872.  
United States War Department.  The War of the Rebellion: v. 1-8 [serial no. 114-121] Correspondence, orders, reports and returns, Union and Confederate, relating to prisoners of war ... and to state or political prisoners.  Washington DC:  U.S. Government Printing Office, 1899.  
Webb, Joanne and Chiles Eakin. Missouri Prisoners of War from Gratiot Street Prison & Myrtle Street Prison, St. Louis, Mo. and Alton Prison, Alton, Illinois: Including Citizens, Confederates, Bushwhackers and Guerrillas.  J.C. Eakin, 1995.    
The British Almanac.  London, UK: Stationers' Company, 1878.
Wines, Enoch Cobb and Theodore William Dwight.  Report on the Prisons and Reformatories of the United States and Canada: Made to the Legislature of New York, January, 1867, Issues 37192-37198 Prison Association of New York''.  Albany, NY:  Van Benthuysen, 1869.  
Alton Prison Civil War Confederate Prisoner Records
Illinois State Prison (Alton) Prisoner Records - Illinois State Archives: Volume 1 (August 29, 1833-November 14, 1841), Volume 3 (May 15, 1847-December 30, 1854), Volume 4 (January 3, 1855-August 12, 1858)
Letter from Wm. S. Scott of Callaway County, Missouri To his Mother from Alton Military Prison, Alton, Illinois, December 10th, 1864, from Confederate soldier in American Civil War collection of University of Missouri-Columbia School of Law.

External links

Alton Prisoner of War Camp

Government buildings completed in 1833
Archaeological sites on the National Register of Historic Places in Illinois
National Register of Historic Places in Madison County, Illinois
Illinois in the American Civil War
Defunct prisons in Illinois
American Civil War prison camps
Alton, Illinois
1833 establishments in Illinois
Temporary populated places on the National Register of Historic Places
1865 disestablishments in Illinois